Kanina is a town and a sub division in Mahendragarh district in the Indian state of Haryana, within the National Capital Region of India.It is one of three administrative blocks of Mahendragarh district and is adjacent to Rewari, Charkhi Dadri, and Jhajjar. It comes in Ahirwal region. It is a municipal committee of Kanina Subdivision in Mahendragarh district.

Demographics 
Kanina is dominated by Yadav (Ahir) caste. Many Ahir are in the Indian Army.

Facilities 
Kanina has a Nagar palik, Tehsil, Court, Judicial Complex, Mini secretariat, Bus stand, Railway station, Fire Station, SDM, BDPO, markets, Anaj Mandi (25 acres), Subji Mandi (6 acres) and Sub divisional Hospital. Kanina block has 47 villages.
Satish yadav 'jaildaar' is the current chairman of kanina municipal committee.
New Anaj Mandi is the 2nd largest Mandi by area and Sabzi Mandi is the largest by area in MAHENDERGARH district

History
Kanina's ancient name was Kanana. It was ruled by King Kalyan Singh, who built the Lord Shiva temple. Kanina is also known as Kanina Mandi. This mandi supplies both rabi and kharif crops.

Culture 
In March (Falgun) on Ekadashi, a mela takes place in the name of Sant Baba Moladh Nath.

Kanina people have earned one Veer-Chakra, one Ashock-Chakra and one police Medal along with many other awards.

Local athlete Rao Sultan Singh Yadav represented India at the Helnsinki olympics. Professional bodybuilder Kuldeep Singh Yadav is achieving success.

Governance
Kanina was a Constituency from independence to 1977. Major MLAs at that time included Subedar Omkar Singh and Rao Dalip Singh. In 1977 Kanina Constituency was split between Jatusana and half in Mahendergarh.
People of Kanina protested that change in 2004.

Villages 
The 47 villages are in Kanina tehsil are Pathera, Kheri, Sayana, Nautana, Uchat, Bhagot, Kotiya, Khirana, Isharana, Kakrala, Kanina Bharaf, Dhanunda, Sehlang, Mori, Mundia khera, Rasulpr, Partal, Sihor, Sundrahq, Bewal, Bhojawas, Chelawas, Dongra jat, Gudha, Kanina, Dongra ahir, Aghiar, Kemla, Talwana, Pota, Jharli, Chhitroli, Kapoori, Karira, Koka, Manpura, Rambas, Mohmadpur, Kalwari, Nangal, Gahra, Gomli, Kanina Unhani, Gomla, Jhigawan, Kharkra Bass, and Dhana.

Geography
Kanina Khas is the epi-centre for around 60 villages from Mahendergarh, Bhiwani and Rewari districts.

Education
 Government College Kanina formerly known as Pitamah Kanh Singh Degree College
 Savitri Devi Girls Degree College
 G.L. Women Degree college
 DAV College of Engineering and Technology, Kanina

Some of the major Schools in Kanina are:
 Yaduvanshi shiksha Niketan
 RPS GOI (will build (by Manish Rao))
 Naisha Sainik Academy
 Geeta High School
 Kids Pride Play School
 OPY World School Kanina at Bharaph
 G.L. Senior secondary school (Kosli Road Kanina)
 D.A.V. Public School
 R.C.M. Public School (gahra road)
 R.R.C.M. Public School (Chinkara Canteen road)
 SADA SUKH CBSE Public School
 Euro International School
 GR International Public School
 Four Government Schools
 AKASH Institute of Technology. 
 Govt college for girls, Unhani

Demographics
Kanina had a population of 13,000 in 2011 census and it is estimated that the population exceeds 23,000 in 2021. Kanina has an average literacy rate of 89%. Mostly, it is Yadav dominated .

Transport

Railways 

Railway station: Kanina Khas
Kanina Railway Line connections Delhi, Rewari with Kanina, Mahendergarh, Loharu, sadulpur, Bikaner.This railway line comes in Bikaner railway line.(double track is proposed from Rewari to Sadulpur)
Charkhi Dadri - Kanina - Kathuwas- Alwar new railway line is proposed.             Reference-https://www.bhaskar.com/local/haryana/mahendragarh/news/new-rail-line-from-dadri-to-kanina-and-kathuwas-to-alwar-3-junctions-2-crossings-and-13-halts-will-be-made-130081980.html

Jhajjar- Kosli - Kanina - Narnaul new railway line is also proposed.                 Reference -https://www.jagran.com/haryana/panchkula-now-preparation-of-jhajjar-and-narnaul-railway-line-in-haryana-after-palwal-and-sonipat-line-20783161.html

Roadways 
 Bus Stand: Kanina

National Highways 
National Highway 152 d passing from Bawania, Buchawas of Kanina sub division is 9.5 km from town.
New 6 lane National Highway is also proposed in Kanina under Bharat mala phase 2, which connects Hisar and Rewari via Kanina

State Highways 
State Highway 24 connecting Rewari-Kanina-Mahendergarh-Loharu
State Highway 22 connecting Bahadurgarh-Jhajjar-Kosli-Kanina

District road connectivity 
MDR-124: Kalanaur -C. Dadri-Kanina-Ateli
MDR-127: Narnaul-Sehma-Kanina
MDR-130: Kanina-Karoli-jharli-Matanhail-Jhajjar

References

Cities and towns in Mahendragarh district